The Sawai Mansingh Stadium is a cricket stadium in Jaipur, Rajasthan, India. It was named after Sawai Man Singh II, the former Maharaja of the state of Jaipur. It is situated at one corner of the PKMB. The stadium seats 30,000. As of July 2013, the stadium and grounds could be toured using Google Street View. As of 19 Aug 2017 it has hosted 1 Test and 19 ODIs.

History

The Sawai Mansingh Stadium has hosted a solitary Test match, between India and Pakistan, starting in February 1987, when Pakistan President General Zia-ul-Haq crossed the border to watch the second day's play as part of his "Cricket for Peace" initiative.

The Test was notable for Younis Ahmed's return to the Test fray after an absence of over 17 years and also for Sunil Gavaskar's dismissal to the first ball of the Test match, for the third time in an otherwise illustrious career.to collect

The game sputtered to a draw after the third day's play was abandoned following heavy rain and a controversy over the alleged deposition of sawdust on the wicket which Pakistan objected to.

The stadium's ODI debut had kicked off with a contest between the same two sides on 2 October 1983. Fresh from their World Cup triumph, the Indians comfortably won by four wickets, sporting the same XI that won the World Cup final.

The ground has also hosted two World Cup matches in 1987 and 1996 respectively, the West Indians losing to England in the former and beating Australia in the latter. The last ODI played on the ground is between India and Australia in October 2013 which they won comfortably by just losing one wicket chasing 362 in just 43.3 overs although it was a disgustingly flat wicket which provided nothing for the bowlers in the slightest.

The highest individual score by any batsman on this ground in ODIs is 183 (not out) by Mahendra Singh Dhoni.

This is also the venue in which Virat Kohli made the fastest 100 for India in ODIs as India chase total of 359 against Australia which was second highest successful chase in ODIs, after the Johannesburg epic between Australia and South Africa.

Re-development

In 2006, the stadium underwent a major renovation at a cost of Rs 400 crore. A world-class cricket academy was built for Rs 7 crore, which has 28 appointed rooms, a gym, a restaurant, 2 conference halls and a swimming pool.

New facilities:

 Media rooms
 Galleries
 2 new blocks
 Capacity

Matches

The first ODI, played at Sawai Mansingh stadium, kicked off with a contest between India and Pakistan in 1983, in which, India won by four wickets. The 1987 Test between India and Pakistan proved to be an instrument of peace, when Pakistan President General Zia-ul-Haq came over to witness the second day's play as part of his "Cricket for Peace" initiative.

The game, which saw Sunil Gavaskar being dismissed to the first ball of a Test match for the third time in his career, ended in a draw amid a controversy over the alleged deposition of sawdust on the wicket that Pakistan objected.

Sawai Mansingh Stadium has hosted IPL matches for Rajasthan Royals its local team and who won first season.

Royals have been deprived of their home advantage because of the inability of the Rajasthan Cricket Association to acquire requisite state government clearances.

Ground records
 
 The highest ODI total at this ground is 362-1 by India against Australia in 2013–14.
 The lowest ODI total at this ground is 125 by England against India.
 The highest individual score by any batsman on this ground in ODI is 183 not out by Mahendra Singh Dhoni on 31 October 2005.
 The Sawai Mansingh Stadium, Jaipur is situated in the picturesque state of Rajasthan, India. The stadium has hosted only one Test between India and Pakistan and it has hosted a number of ODIs.
 This is also the ground where Sourav Ganguly and Sachin Tendulkar most successful opening pair for India in ODIs opened the innings for the first time.

Latest progress 
After announcement of shifting of some Indian Premier League matches in Maharashtra due to a severe drought situation in 2016, the IPL franchise Mumbai Indians opted for this stadium as its home ground as a substitution for Wankhede Stadium in Mumbai.

Major tournaments

 1987 & 1996 Cricket World Cup
 2006 Women's Asia Cup
 2006 ICC Champions Trophy

List of Centuries

Key
 * denotes that the batsman was not out.
 Inns. denotes the number of the innings in the match.
 Balls denotes the number of balls faced in an innings.
 NR denotes that the number of balls was not recorded.
 Parentheses next to the player's score denotes his century number at Edgbaston.
 The column title Date refers to the date the match started.
 The column title Result refers to the player's team result

Test Centuries

One Day Internationals

See also

 Rajasthan State Sports Council
 Sawai Mansingh Indoor Stadium
 List of Test cricket grounds
 One-Test wonder

References

Test cricket grounds in India
Cricket grounds in Rajasthan
Sports venues in Jaipur
Sports venues completed in 1969
1969 establishments in Rajasthan
1987 Cricket World Cup stadiums
1996 Cricket World Cup stadiums
20th-century architecture in India